Jeyran Mangeh (also Romanized as Jeyrān Mangeh, and also known as Jeyrān Mīngeh) is a village in Zarrineh Rural District, Karaftu District, Divandarreh County, Kurdistan Province, Iran. At the 2006 census, its population was 332, in 61 families. The village is populated by Kurds.

References 

Towns and villages in Divandarreh County
Kurdish settlements in Kurdistan Province